During the 2000–01 Dutch football season, AFC Ajax competed in the Eredivisie.

Season summary
Although Ajax recorded the same points total as the previous season, this year their tally was enough for third place, which allowed them to qualify for the third qualifying round of the Champions League.

First-team squad
Squad at end of season

Left club during season

Jong Ajax

Transfers

Out
 Frank Verlaat - SV Werder Bremen
 Brian Laudrup - retired
 Dani - S.L. Benfica
 Serge van den Ban - HFC Haarlem

Results

UEFA Cup

First round

Ajax won 9–0 on aggregate.

Second round

Lausanne win 3–2 on aggregate

References

AFC Ajax seasons
Dutch football clubs 2000–01 season